Note — many sporting events did not take place because of World War II

1940 in sports describes the year's events in world sport.

Alpine skiing
FIS Alpine World Ski Championships
 The 10th FIS Alpine World Ski Championships are cancelled due to World War II

American football
NFL championship
 The Chicago Bears defeat the Washington Redskins 73–0 in the NFL championship game.
 This game still holds records for the highest score and biggest win in National Football League history.
College championship
 College football national championship – Minnesota Golden Gophers

Association football
La Liga – won by Athletic Aviación Club
Serie A – won by S.S. Ambrosiana-Inter
Primeira Liga – won by F.C. Porto.
There is no major football competition in England, Scotland or France due to World War II. In England, several regional leagues are set up but statistics from these are not counted in players’ figures.

Athletics
 The 1940 Summer Olympics to be held in Helsinki, were cancelled due to outbreak of World War II. The major international athletics event of the year was thus the annual Finland-Sweden athletics international, held at the new Helsinki Olympic Stadium, exceptionally held as a triple international between Finland, Sweden and Germany.

Australian rules football
 Victorian Football League
 28 September: Melbourne wins the 44th VFL Premiership, defeating Richmond 15.17 (107) to 10.8 (68) in the 1940 VFL Grand Final.
 Brownlow Medal awarded to Des Fothergill (Collingwood) and Herbie Matthews (South Melbourne)
 South Australian National Football League
 28 September: Sturt 14.16 (100) defeat South Adelaide 11.13 (79) for their fifth SANFL premiership, but their last until 1966.
 Western Australian National Football League
 17 August: Claremont become the first team to score 200 points in a senior WANFL match when they kick 33.22 (220) against Swan Districts.
 12 October: Claremont 13.13 (91) defeat South Fremantle 9.20 (74) for their third successive WANFL premiership.

Baseball
 The Cincinnati Reds defeated the Detroit Tigers in the 1940 World Series by 4 games to 3

Basketball
NBL Championship

Akron Firestone Non-Skids win three games to two over the Oshkosh All-Stars

Events
 The eighth South American Basketball Championship in Montevideo is won by Uruguay.

Boxing
Events
 4 October – Henry Armstrong loses the last of his three world titles when defeated by new World Welterweight Champion Fritzie Zivic over fifteen rounds in New York City
Lineal world champions
 World Heavyweight Championship – Joe Louis
 World Light Heavyweight Championship – Billy Conn
 World Middleweight Championship – vacant
 World Welterweight Championship – Henry Armstrong → Fritzie Zivic
 World Lightweight Championship – Lou Ambers → Lew Jenkins
 World Featherweight Championship – Joey Archibald → Harry Jeffra
 World Bantamweight Championship – vacant → Lou Salica
 World Flyweight Championship – vacant

Cricket
England
 Because of World War II, no first-class cricket is played in England from 1940 to 1944, and the Minor Counties Championship is similarly not contested until 1946.
Australia
 Sheffield Shield – New South Wales
 Most runs – Don Bradman, 1475 @ 122.61 (HS 267)
 Most wickets – Clarrie Grimmett 73 @ 22.65 (BB 6–57)
India
 Ranji Trophy – Maharashtra defeats United Provinces by ten wickets.
 Bombay Pentangular – Hindus
New Zealand
 Plunket Shield – Auckland
South Africa
 The Currie Cup is not contested, but a total of nineteen first-class friendly matches are held. Inter-provincial cricket is abandoned after the 1939–40 season until the end of the war.
 Most runs – Eric Rowan, 590 @ 147.50 (HS 306 not out)
 Most wickets – Norman Gordon 28 @ 14.92 (BB 6–61)
West Indies
 No first-class cricket is played in the 1939–40 season due to the outbreak of World War II, though in later years a few matches are arranged.

Cycling
Tour de France
 not contested due to World War II
Giro d'Italia
 Fausto Coppi

Figure skating
World Figure Skating Championships
 not contested due to World War II

Golf
Men's professional
 Masters Tournament – Jimmy Demaret
 U.S. Open – Lawson Little
 British Open – not played due to World War II
 PGA Championship – Byron Nelson
Men's amateur
 British Amateur – not played due to World War II
 U.S. Amateur – Dick Chapman
Women's professional
 Women's Western Open – Babe Zaharias
 Titleholders Championship – Helen Hicks

Horse racing
 March 2 – in his final race, Seabiscuit wins the $121,000 Santa Anita Handicap
Steeplechases
 Cheltenham Gold Cup – Roman Hackle
 Grand National – Bogskar
Hurdle races
 Champion Hurdle – Solford
Flat races
 Australia – Melbourne Cup won by Old Rowley
 Canada – King's Plate won by Willie the Kid
 France – Prix de l'Arc de Triomphe – not held due to World War II
 Ireland – Irish Derby Stakes won by Turkhan
 English Triple Crown Races:
 2,000 Guineas Stakes – Djebel
 The Derby – Pont l'Eveque
 St. Leger Stakes – Turkhan
 United States Triple Crown Races:
 Kentucky Derby – Gallahadion
 Preakness Stakes – Bimelech
 Belmont Stakes – Bimelech

Ice hockey
 The New York Rangers defeat the Toronto Maple Leafs 4 games to 2 to win the National Hockey League's Stanley Cup.

Motorsport

Olympic Games
1940 Winter Olympics
 The 1940 Winter Olympics, due to take place at Sapporo, are cancelled due to World War II

1940 Summer Olympics
 The 1940 Summer Olympics, due to take place at Tokyo, are cancelled due to World War II

Rowing
The Boat Race
 Oxford and Cambridge Boat Race is not contested due to World War II

Rugby league
1940 New Zealand rugby league season
1940 NSWRFL season
1939–40 Northern Rugby Football League Wartime Emergency League season / 1940–41 Northern Rugby Football League Wartime Emergency League season

Rugby union
 Five Nations Championship series is not contested due to World War II

Speed skating
Speed Skating World Championships
 not contested due to World War II

Tennis
Australia
 Australian Men's Singles Championship – Adrian Quist (Australia) defeats Jack Crawford (Australia) 6–3, 6–1, 6–2
 Australian Women's Singles Championship – Nancye Wynne Bolton (Australia) defeats Thelma Coyne Long (Australia) 5–7, 6–4, 6–0
England
 Wimbledon Men's Singles Championship – not contested
 Wimbledon Women's Singles Championship – not contested
France
 French Men's Singles Championship – not contested
 French Women's Singles Championship – not contested
USA
 American Men's Singles Championship – Don McNeill (USA) defeats Bobby Riggs (USA) 4–6, 6–8, 6–3, 6–3, 7–5
 American Women's Singles Championship – Alice Marble (USA) defeats Helen Jacobs (USA) 6–2, 6–3
Davis Cup
 1940 International Lawn Tennis Challenge – not contested

Awards
 Associated Press Male Athlete of the Year – Tom Harmon, College football
 Associated Press Female Athlete of the Year – Alice Marble, Tennis

References

 
Sports by year